The 1934 United States Senate elections in Wyoming took place on November 6, 1934. Incumbent Democratic Senator John B. Kendrick died on November 3, 1933, and Joseph C. O'Mahoney was appointed by Governor Leslie A. Miller as Kendrick's replacement. Two elections for the same Senate seat were held on the same day; one as a special election to fill the remainder of Kendrick's original six-year term, and another to select a Senator to serve the next six-year term. O'Mahoney ran for re-election in both elections. He was opposed by Republican Congressman Vincent Carter. Aided by the strong performance by the Democratic Party throughout the country in 1934, and by Governor Miller's landslide re-election, O'Mahoney handily defeated Carter to win re-election.

Democratic primary

Candidates
 Joseph C. O'Mahoney, incumbent U.S. Senator

Results

Regular election

Special election

Republican Primary

Candidates
 Vincent Carter, U.S. Congressman from Wyoming's at-large congressional district
 J. Elmer Brock, Vice-President of the Wyoming Stock Growers Association 
 Harry P. Ilsley, Judge on the Seventh Judicial District of Wyoming (only filed for the regular election)
 M. A. Underwood, rancher  (only filed for the regular election)

Dropped out
 Charles E. Winter, former U.S. Congressman from Wyoming's at-large congressional district (running for Congress)

Results

Regular election

Special election

General election

Results

Regular election

Special election

References

United States Senate 1934
1934
Wyoming 1934
Wyoming 1934
Wyoming
United States Senate